This is a list of city and town halls. Buildings used as the seat of local government are in this context classed as city or town halls.

Argentina 
 Buenos Aires City Hall
 La Plata City Hall
 Palacio de los Leones

Armenia 
 Yerevan City Hall

Australia

New South Wales 

 Alexandria
 Annandale
 Balmain 
 Botany
 Darlington
 Erskineville
 Glebe
 Granville
 Hornsby
 Hunters Hill
 Leichhardt
 Manly
 Marrickville
 Newtown
 North Sydney
 Paddington
 Parramatta
 Petersham
 Randwick
 Redfern
 Rockdale
 Ryde
 Sydney
 Warringah
 Waterloo
 Willoughby
 Woollahra

Queensland 

 Brisbane City Hall
 Toowoomba City Hall

South Australia 

 Adelaide Town Hall

Tasmania 
 Hobart Town Hall

Victoria 

 Melbourne Town Hall

Western Australia 

 Perth Town Hall
 Fremantle Town Hall

Austria 
 Rathaus, Vienna

Bangladesh 

 Dhaka Nagar Bhaban
 Rangpur Town Hall
 Aswini Kumar Town Hall, Barisal

Belgium 

 Schepenhuis, Aalst
 Antwerp City Hall
 Brussels Town Hall
 Kortrijk City Hall
 Leuven Town Hall
 Old Town Hall, Lo
 Oudenaarde Town Hall

Bosnia and Herzegovina 
 Sarajevo City Hall (Vijećnica)

Brazil 
 Matarazzo Building

Canada

Croatia 
 Old City Hall (Zagreb)
 Pula Communal Palace
 Rector's Palace, Dubrovnik

Czech Republic 
 Liberec Town Hall
 New Town Hall (Prague)
 New City Hall, Ostrava

Denmark 
 Aarhus City Hall
 Copenhagen City Hall
 Frederiksberg Town Hall

Estonia 
 Narva Town Hall
 Tallinn Town Hall
 Tartu Town Hall

France 
 Hôtel de Ville, Paris
 Palais Rohan, Bordeaux
 Capitole de Toulouse
 Lyon City Hall
 Hôtel de Hanau, the town hall of Strasbourg
 Town Hall of Benfeld
 Town Hall of Wissembourg

Finland 

 Helsinki City Hall
 Jakobstad City Hall
 Kuopio City Hall
 Lahti Town Hall
 Oulu City Hall
 Pori Old Town Hall
 Rauma Old Town Hall
 Säynätsalo Town Hall
 Turku City Hall

Germany 

 Augsburg Town Hall
 Bremen City Hall
 Cologne City Hall
 Essen City Hall
 Old Town Hall (Halle, Germany)
 Hamburg Rathaus
 New Town Hall (Hanover)
 Kaiserslautern Town Hall
 New Town Hall, Munich
 Historical City Hall of Münster
 Recklinghausen City Hall
 Rathaus Schöneberg
 Rotes Rathaus
 Römer

Georgia 
 Tbilisi City Hall

Hong Kong 
 Hong Kong City Hall
 North District Town Hall
 Sha Tin Town Hall
 Tsuen Wan Town Hall
 Tuen Mun Town Hall
 Yuen Long Town Hall

Hungary 
 Kecskemét City Hall

India 

 Delhi Town Hall
Shimla Town Hall
 Kanpur Town Hall
 Kolkata Town Hall
 King George Hall
 King Edward Memorial Hall

Indonesia 
 Cirebon City Hall
 Jakarta City Hall
 Medan City Hall
 Surabaya City Hall

Italy 
 Ca' Farsetti and Ca' Loredan, Venice City Hall
 Palazzo Senatorio
 Palazzo della Ragione, Padua
 Palazzo Pubblico
 Palazzo Vecchio
 Palazzo dell'Arengo

Iceland 
 Ráðhús Reykjavíkur, Reykjavík's City Hall

Ireland 
 City Hall, Dublin

Lithuania 

 Town Hall, Kaunas
 Town Hall, Vilnius
 Town Hall, Kėdainiai

Luxembourg 
 Luxembourg City Hall
 Mamer Castle

Malta 
 Auberge de France in Birgu
 Banca Giuratale in Victoria, Gozo
 Corte Capitanale in Mdina
 Della Grazie Battery in Xgħajra

Netherlands 

 City Hall (Haarlem)
 Royal Palace of Amsterdam (former town hall)
 City Hall (Delft)
 Maastricht City Hall
 Middelburg Town Hall
 Old City Hall (The Hague)
 Rotterdam City Hall
 Former town hall of Nieuwer-Amstel
 City Hall, Groningen
 City Hall, Dordrecht
 City Hall, Kampen
 Hilversum Town Hall
 City Hall, Weesp
 Gemeenlandshuis
 Gemeenlandshuis van Rijnland
 Gemeenlandshuis Zwanenburg
 Stopera

New Zealand 
 Auckland Town Hall
 Christchurch Town Hall
 Dunedin Town Hall
 Wellington Town Hall

Norway 

 Oslo City Hall

Philippines

 Cebu City Hall
 Manila City Hall
 Quezon City Hall

Poland 

 Commission Palace in Warsaw
 Brzeg Town Hall
 Byczyna Town Hall
 Cieszyn Town Hall
 Gdańsk Town Hall
 Głogówek Town Hall
 Głubczyce Town Hall
 Grodków Town Hall
 Iława Town Hall
 Kluczbork Town Hall
 Kraków Town Hall
 Lewin Brzeski Town Hall
 Lublin New Town Hall
 Namysłów Town Hall
 Nowe Warpno Town Hall
 Olesno Town Hall
 Opole Town Hall
 Otmuchów Town Hall
 Paczków Town Hall
 Poznań City Hall
 Prudnik Town Hall
 Sandomierz Town Hall
 Słupsk Town Hall
 Strzelce Opolskie Town Hall
 Szczecin Old Town Hall
 Old Town Hall, Szombierki
 Szydłowiec Town Hall
 Warsaw City Hall
 Wrocław Town Hall

Portugal 
 Lisbon City Hall
 Braga Town Hall
 Póvoa de Varzim City Hall

Puerto Rico 
 Mayagüez City Hall
 Ponce City Hall
 San Juan City Hall

Romania
 Bucharest City Hall

Russia 
 City Hall and City Duma
 Mariinsky Palace
 Moscow City Hall
 Saint Petersburg City Duma

San Marino 
 Palazzo Pubblico (San Marino)

Serbia
 Belgrade
 Sremski Karlovci City Hall

Slovakia 

 Old Town Hall (Bratislava)
 Old Town Hall (Levoča)
 Town Hall in Bardejov

Slovenia 
 Ljubljana Town Hall
 Maribor Town Hall

South Africa 
 Cape Town City Hall
 Pretoria City Hall
 Johannesburg City Hall
 Bloemfontein City Hall

Spain 

 Madrid City Hall
 Bilbao City Hall
 San Sebastián City Hall
 Salamanca City Hall
 Melgar de Fernamental Town Hall

Sri Lanka 
 Town Hall, Colombo

Sweden 
 Ludvika Town Hall
 Stockholm City Hall

Ukraine 
 Kyiv City Duma building
 Buchach townhall
 Ivano-Frankivsk Town Hall
 Lviv Town Hall
 Odessa City Hall

United Kingdom

United States

Vietnam 
Each province, municipality, city and district has a People's Committee (executive) and a People's Council (legislative)
For example:

 People's Committee of Hanoi and People's Council of Hanoi
 People's Committee of Ho Chi Minh City and People's Council of Ho Chi Minh City

See also 
 City hall

City and town halls
Local government-related lists